Factcheck or Fact-check can refer to:
 FactCheck.org, a website funded by the Annenberg Foundation
 Fact-checking, a job in journalism